Fyodor Fyodorovich Fedorovsky (December 26 (O.S. December 14), 1883 in Chernigov – September 7, 1955 in Moscow) was a Soviet stage designer, People's Artist of the USSR (1951), and active member of the Soviet Academy of Arts (1947; in 1947-1953 - academy's vice president), author of Kremlin stars.

Fyodor Fedorovsky was awarded the Stalin Prize on several occasions (1941, 1943, 1949, 1950, 1951), Order of Lenin, two other orders, and numerous medals.

1883 births
1955 deaths
Russian scenic designers
People's Artists of the USSR (visual arts)
Full Members of the USSR Academy of Arts
Stalin Prize winners
20th-century Russian painters
Russian male painters